Ira Wallach (January 22, 1913 – December 2, 1995) was an American screenwriter and novelist.

Born in New Rochelle, New York, Wallach wrote the novel Muscle Beach and collaborated with Peter Ustinov on the screenplay for Hot Millions. Wallach died of pneumonia.

Filmography:

Boys' Night Out (1962)
The Wheeler Dealers (1963)
Don't Make Waves (1967) (based on the 1959 novel Muscle Beach)
Hot Millions (1968)

References

1913 births
1995 deaths
American male screenwriters
20th-century American novelists
Writers from New Rochelle, New York
Writers from New York City
Deaths from pneumonia in New York (state)
American male novelists
20th-century American male writers
Novelists from New York (state)
Screenwriters from New York (state)
20th-century American screenwriters